Pedro Díaz Fanjul (born 5 June 1998) is a Spanish footballer who plays for Sporting de Gijón as a central midfielder.

Club career
Born in Siero, Asturias, Díaz was a Sporting de Gijón youth graduate. He made his senior debut with the reserves on 8 March 2015 at the age of just 16, starting in a 1–3 Segunda División B away loss against Racing de Ferrol.

Díaz renewed his contract until 2019 on 30 December 2015. He scored his first senior goal four days later, netting the last in a 2–0 away win against CD Guijuelo.

Díaz made his first team debut on 6 September 2017, starting in a 1–0 win at CF Reus Deportiu, for the season's Copa del Rey. Ahead of the 2019–20 campaign, he was definitely promoted to the main squad.

References

External links

1998 births
Living people
People from Siero
Spanish footballers
Footballers from Asturias
Association football midfielders
Segunda División B players
Tercera División players
Sporting de Gijón B players
Sporting de Gijón players
Spain youth international footballers